Mackail is a surname. Notable people with the surname include:

 Craig Mackail-Smith (born 1984), British footballer
 Denis Mackail (1892–1971), English writer
 Hugh Mackail ( 1640–1666), Scottish martyr
 John William Mackail (1859–1945), Scottish man of letters